Bråkar och Johanna ("Bråkar and Johanna") was the 1996 edition of Sveriges Radio's Christmas Calendar.

Plot
Johanna is out in the forest with her grandfather on her mother's side, when Johanna falls into a hibernation hole, waking up a sleeping bear.

References
 

1996 radio programme debuts
1996 radio programme endings
Sveriges Radio's Christmas Calendar